Euodia may refer to:
 Euodia (diatom), a genus in the family Eunotiaceae
 Euodia (plant), a plant genus in the family Rutaceae
 Tetradium, related genus known in cultivation in English-speaking countries as Euodia
 Euodia (New Testament), a woman mentioned in the New Testament book of Philippians

See also
 Evodius, an Early Christian bishop of Antioch